Carl Lindström may refer to:

 Carl Lindström Company, a record company founded in 1893
 Carl Gustaf Lindström (1779–1855), Swedish opera singer
 Carl Herbert Lindström (1886–1951), Swedish fisherman, policeman, and tug of war competitor at the 1912 Summer Olympics

Lindstrom, Carl